FC Avanhard Zhovti Vody is a Ukrainian amateur football club from Zhovti Vody, Dnipropetrovsk Oblast.

In 1959–70 as Avanhard the club participated in the championship of the Ukrainian SSR among teams of masters (professional). Since 1993 it was known as Sirius and in 1994 moved to Kryvyi Rih. In 1995 Sirius was merged with a local amateur team Sportinvest Kryvyi Rih which replaced Sirius in competition for year. In 1996 the club folded. It was replaced by Nyva Bershad. In 2010 was the club refounded.

League and cup history

{|class="wikitable"
|-bgcolor="#efefef"
! Season
! Div.
! Pos.
! Pl.
! W
! D
! L
! GS
! GA
! P
!Domestic Cup
!colspan=2|Europe
!Notes
|}

Coaches
 1992–1993 Vladimir Spiridonov
 1993 Mykola Fedorenko
 1994–1995 Mykhailo Palamarchuk (interim, playing coach)
 1995 Yuriy Ustynov
 1995 Vladimir Brukhti

See also
FC Hirnyk Kryvyi Rih
FC Nyva Bershad

 
Avanhard (sports society)
Amateur football clubs in Ukraine
Football clubs in Kryvyi Rih
Zhovti Vody
Association football clubs established in 1956
1956 establishments in Ukraine